(For the 1929 talkie see The Isle of Lost Ships (1929 film))

The Isle of Lost Ships is a 1923 American silent adventure/melodrama film directed and produced by Maurice Tourneur and distributed by Associated First National Pictures. The film is based on Crittenden Marriott's novel The Isle of Dead Ships c.1909. The story was re-filmed in 1929 by director Irvin Willat.

Tourneur himself made a different story with similar theme called The Ship of Lost Souls (1929) which had a young German actress, Marlene Dietrich, in the cast.

The 1923 film has long since been thought to be lost.

Cast
Anna Q. Nilsson as Dorothy Fairfax
Milton Sills as Frank Howard
Frank Campeau as Detective Jackson
Walter Long as Peter Forbes
Bert Woodruff as Patrick Joyce
Aggie Herring as Mother Joyce
Herschel Mayall as Captain Clark

Story
People and ships trapped in seaweed infested section of the southern Atlantic Ocean known as the Sargasso Sea.

See also
List of lost films
 The Lost Continent (1968). Also set in the Sargasso Sea.

References

External links

L'lle des Naivres Perdus (The Isle of Lost Ships); allmovie.com
Lantern slide for The Isle of Lost Ships...retrieved version from Wayback (archived)
Consortium of advertisements for the film, lobby poster, slide, issue of Photoplay magazine

1923 films
American silent feature films
American black-and-white films
Films directed by Maurice Tourneur
Lost American films
1920s adventure drama films
First National Pictures films
Films based on American novels
Films about survivors of seafaring accidents or incidents
American adventure drama films
1923 drama films
1920s American films
Silent American drama films
Silent adventure drama films